Forum Freies Theater  is a theatre in Düsseldorf, North Rhine-Westphalia, Germany.

Theatres in Düsseldorf